Haitham Kadhim Tahir (born 21 July 1983) is an Iraqi retired football midfielder who last played for the Al-Quwa Al-Jawiya football club.

Information
After winning the Iraq league title with Al Zawraa, Haitham Kadhim moved to Arbil FC in August 2006. He has been named in the senior national team on several occasions.

Honours

Club 
Al-Zawraa
 Iraqi Premier League: 2005–06
Erbil
 Iraqi Premier League: 2006–07
Al-Quwa Al-Jawiya
 Iraq FA Cup: 2015–16

Country 
 2002 Arab Police Championship: Champions
 2005 West Asian Games Gold medallist.
 2007 Asian Cup winner
 2013 World Men's Military Cup: Champions

External links

Association football midfielders
Iraqi footballers
Iraq international footballers
1983 births
Al-Zawraa SC players
Iraqi expatriate footballers
Expatriate footballers in Iran
Living people
Al-Quwa Al-Jawiya players
Expatriate footballers in Jordan
2007 AFC Asian Cup players
AFC Asian Cup-winning players